Ophiophagy (Greek:) is a specialized form of feeding or alimentary behavior of animals which hunt and eat snakes. There are ophiophagous mammals (such as the skunks and the mongooses), birds (such as snake eagles, the secretarybird, and some hawks), lizards (such as the common collared lizard), and even other snakes, such as the Central and South American mussuranas and the North American common kingsnake. The genus of the venomous king cobra (Ophiophagus hannah) is named for this habit.

Ophiophagy in myth and legend
The mythic associations of snakes are discussed at Serpent (symbolism).
A snake-eating bird of prey appears in a legend of the Mexican people, who gave rise to the Aztec empire, and it is represented in the Mexican flag: The Mexicas, guided by their god Huitzilopochtli, sought a place where the bird landed on a prickly pear cactus, devouring a snake. They found the sign on an island in Lake Texcoco, where they erected the city of Tenochtitlan ("Place of the Prickly Pear Cactus" – present-day Mexico City) in 1325. (In the coat of arms of Mexico this bird is depicted as a golden eagle, though it is often said to be a crested caracara. It is also possible that the bird was a laughing falcon or snake hawk, a bird of prey which feeds almost exclusively on snakes.)  

The golden eagle does actually eat snakes, but does not specialize in them. Snakes are the most common group of reptiles in the golden eagle's diet, making up about 2.9% of the remains from all studied golden eagle nests. 

The Mayans also had the legend of ophiophagy in their folklore and mythology.

Guatemala may derive its name from the Nahuatl word coactlmoctl-lan, meaning "land of the snake-eating bird."

Christian scripture associates snakes with evil (see serpent) and considers anything that destroys them good. An example for this tradition is Rudyard Kipling's short story "Rikki-Tikki-Tavi" (in The Jungle Book), in which Rikki-Tikki, a mongoose, defends a human family against a pair of evil cobras.

In Hindu and Buddhist folklore, Garuda, the mount of Vishnu, is the enemy to the Nāgas, a race of intelligent serpent- or dragon-like beings, whom he hunts.

Practical use

In some regions, farmers keep ophiophagous animals as pets in order to keep their living environment clear of such snakes as cobras and pit vipers (including rattlesnakes and lanceheads) which annually claim a large number of deaths of domestic animals, such as cattle, and bites on humans. An example is tamed mongooses in India. In the 1930s a Brazilian plan to breed and release large numbers of mussuranas for the control of pit vipers was tried but did not work. The Butantan Institute, in São Paulo, which specializes in the production of antivenoms, erected a statue of the mussurana Clelia clelia as its symbol and a tribute to its usefulness in combating venomous snake bites. Peafowl have been kept for millennia due to their ophiophagous habit.

Immunity
Many ophiophagous animals seem to be immune to the venom of the usual snakes they prey and feed upon. The phenomenon was studied in the mussurana by the Brazilian scientist Vital Brazil. They have antihemorrhagic and antineurotoxic antibodies in their blood. The Virginia opossum (Didelphis virginiana) has been found to have the most resistance towards snake venom. This immunity is not acquired and has probably evolved as an adaptation to predation by venomous snakes in their habitat.

In Rudyard Kipling's The Jungle Book, the author correctly dismisses the idea of mongooses ingesting herbs to combat poison as old folklore. He attributes no special abilities to the animal other than superb agility and skill at avoiding being bitten. However, recent studies have shown that the mongoose's ability to resist snake venom is at least in part due to its modified nicotinic acetylcholine receptor (AcChoR) that does not bind with alpha-BTX, and alpha-neurotoxin.

References

External links

The Brahmani and the Mongoose.
History of Mexico National Coat of Arms.
Laughing falcon (Herpetotheres cachinnans) in canopy with false coral snake (Erythrolampus mimus) prey from Bio-Ditrl, Department of Biological Sciences, University of Alberta, accessed July 27, 2006.
Photo series and description: Ophiophagous kingsnake eating another snake.
YouTube video of a red-shouldered hawk eating a snake.
ncbi.nlm.nih.gov 

Snakes
Trophic ecology
Carnivory